Kaituozhe may refer to:

 Kaituozhe (rocket family), the KT series of space launch vehicles built by China Aerospace Science and Technology Corporation (CASC)

See also
 Pioneer (disambiguation)
 Kuaizhou